Gustaf Caspar Orm Skarsgård (born 12 November 1980) is a Swedish actor. He is known for his roles in Evil (2003), The Way Back (2010) and Kon-Tiki (2012). He also appeared in the HBO TV series Westworld (2018), as Merlin in the Netflix TV series Cursed (2020),   and as Floki in the History Channel series Vikings (2013–2020).

Early life 
Skarsgård was born on 12 November 1980 in Stockholm, Sweden, to Swedish actor Stellan Skarsgård and his first wife, My, a physician. He has five siblings: Alexander, Sam, Bill, Eija and Valter, and two half-brothers Ossian and Kolbjörn by his father's second marriage, to Megan Everett. Alexander, Bill, and Valter are also actors. His godfather is Swedish actor Peter Stormare. Gustaf decided to follow in his father's footsteps as an actor at the age of six and attended drama school.

Career 
Skarsgård’s film debut was in 1989 in the short film Prima Ballerina, where he played a ballet pupil. The same year, Skarsgård starred in the Swedish Film Codename Coq Rouge. Gustaf Skarsgård continued with several children's and youth roles, for example, Min vän Percys magiska gymnastikskor (1994) and Skuggornas hus (1996). 

He attended the Swedish National Academy of Mime and Acting in Stockholm (Teaterhögskolan) from 1998 to 2003, before joining the Royal Dramatic Theatre, Stockholm. He played in several of Shakespeare’s, Chekhov's and Söderberg’s works both on the Royal Dramatic Theatre and on Stockholm City Theatre. In 2003 he performed in Evil and 2008 in Patrik 1,5. For both roles he was nominated for the Guldbagge Award as Best Supporting Actor and as Best Leading Actor. The same year he was awarded the Shooting Star at the Berlin International Film Festival. He finally won the Guldbagge as Best Leading Actor for his performance in Förortsungar. 

In 2012, Skarsgård joined the History Channel's series Vikings in the main role of Floki, the shipbuilder. In 2018, he joined the cast of Westworld as Karl Strand for five episodes.

In March 2020, Skarsgård starred in a main role as Merlin, in Cursed, a Netflix original television series based on a re-imaging of the Arthurian legend.

Personal life 
Gustaf Skarsgård was in a relationship with actress Hanna Alström from 1999 to 2005.

Awards and distinctions 

Skarsgård won a Guldbagge Awards for Kidz In da Hood. He won the European Film Academy's Shooting Stars Award in 2007.

Filmography

Film

Television

Notes

References

External links 

 
 
 Gustaf Skarsgård in The Big Leap

1980 births
Living people
20th-century Swedish male actors
21st-century Swedish male actors
Best Actor Guldbagge Award winners
Male actors from Stockholm
Gustaf
Swedish male film actors
Swedish male television actors